Nora Listach (March 22, 1910 – August 14, 1987) was an American Negro league outfielder in the 1940s.

A native of Natchitoches, Louisiana, Listach was the grandfather of fellow major leaguer Pat Listach, and played for the Birmingham Black Barons in 1941. In nine recorded games, he posted eight hits in 31 plate appearances. Listach died in Cincinnati, Ohio in 1987 at age 77.

References

External links
 and Baseball-Reference Black Baseball Stats and Seamheads

1910 births
1987 deaths
Birmingham Black Barons players
Baseball outfielders
Baseball players from Louisiana
Sportspeople from Natchitoches, Louisiana
20th-century African-American sportspeople